David Blixt (born July 12, 1973, in Ann Arbor, Michigan) is an American author, stage actor, and director living Chicago, Illinois. Blixt currently serves as an Artistic Associate at the Michigan Shakespeare Festival and is the MSF's resident Fight Director (Violence Designer). He has directed several plays, including a 2004 production of The Complete Works of William Shakespeare (Abridged). Since 2011 he has been on the arts faculty of the Chicago High School for the Arts. In 2012 he and Broadway veteran Rick Sordelet launched their own printing imprint Sordelet Ink, which focuses on publishing playscripts as well as some of Blixt's own works.

An authority on Shakespeare's Romeo & Juliet, in 2014 Blixt and his wife Janice L Blixt were guests of the city of Verona, Italy for the launch of the Italian language edition of his novel The Master Of Verona. He also collaborated on the script for filmmaker Anna Lerario's documentary about the life of Verona's prince, Cangrande della Scala.

In 2017 his novel Her Majesty's Will, a comedy in which William Shakespeare and Christopher Marlowe foil a plot on Queen Elizabeth's life, was adapted for the stage by Robert Kauzlaric for Lifeline Theatre.

In 2021 Blixt announced the discovery of eleven lost novels by journalist Nellie Bly, which he subsequently published as The Lost Novels Of Nellie Bly.

Awards
Wilde Award for Best Actor-Comedy (2014, won for The Importance of Being Earnest)
Wilde Award for Best Actor-Comedy (2019, won for Cyrano de Bergerac)
Joseph Jefferson Award for Fight Choreography (2022, won with Christian Kelly-Sordelet for Athena)
 Nominated for the Joseph Jefferson Award for Fight Choreography. (2015, for Macbeth at The Artistic Home, 2018 for Her Majesty's Will at Lifeline Theatre)

Bibliography

The Adventures Of Nellie Bly
 What Girls Are Good For: A Novel of Nellie Bly (2018) 
 Charity Girl: A Nellie Bly Novelette (2020)
 Clever Girl: A Nellie Bly Novella (2020)

Star-Cross'd Series
 The Master of Verona (2007)
 Voice of the Falconer (2010)
 Fortune's Fool (2012)
 The Prince's Doom (2014)
 Varnished Faces: Star-Cross'd Short Stories (2015)

Colossus Series
 Stone & Steel (2012)
 The Four Emperors (2013)
 Wail of the Fallen (TBA)
 The Hollow Triumph (TBA)

Will & Kit Series
 Her Majesty's Will (2012)

Scripts
Eve of Ides (2012)

Non-Fiction
Shakespeare's Secrets: Romeo & Juliet (2018)
Tomorrow & Tomorrow: Essays On Shakespeare's Macbeth (2012, with Janice L Blixt)
Fighting Words: A Combat Glossary (2016)

Editor
The Lost Novels Of Nellie Bly
The Mystery Of Central Park 
Eva The Adventuress 
New York By Night 
Alta Lynn, M.D. (Introduction by Blixt, edited by Robert Kauzlaric) 
Wayne's Faithful Sweetheart (Introduction by Blixt, edited by Robert Kauzlaric) 
Little Luckie, or Playing For Hearts 
In Love With A Stranger, or Through Fire And Water To Win Him 
The Love Of Three Girls 
Little Penny, Child Of The Streets (Introduction by Blixt, edited by Robert Kauzlaric)  
Pretty Merribelle 
Twins & Rivals

Other Nellie Bly Works
Into The Madhouse: The Complete Reporting Surrounding Nellie Bly's Expose of the Blackwell's Island Insane Asylum (2021)
Nellie Bly's World Vol 1: 1887–1888 (2021)
Nellie Bly's World Vol 2: 1889–1890 (2021)

References

External links

21st-century American novelists
21st-century American dramatists and playwrights
American male novelists
Writers from Chicago
1973 births
Living people
American male dramatists and playwrights
21st-century American male writers
Novelists from Illinois